The 2014–15 Ontario Fury season was the second season of the Ontario Fury professional indoor soccer club. The Fury, a Pacific Division team in the Major Arena Soccer League, played their home games in the Citizens Business Bank Arena in Ontario, California.

The team was led by general manager and head coach Bernie Lilavois plus assistant coach Joe Pollard. The Ladies of Fury dance team was directed by Lynae de Leon. Ontario finished the 2014–15 season with a 13–7 record, second best in the Pacific Division, but lost their first-round playoff game to the Las Vegas Legends.

Season summary
The Fury struggled early in the season, losing 3 of their first 4 games. A road win over the Rochester Lancers began a 5-game in streak stopped by an overtime loss to the Turlock Express. 2014 ended with a win over the Sacramento Surge and 2015 began with a loss to the Las Vegas Legends. A home win over the Harrisburg Heat was the first of 6 consecutive wins that followed. A pair of losses to the San Diego Sockers at home and on the road left Ontario with a 13–7 record and 2nd place in the Pacific Division. The Fury qualified for the post-season but fell 5–6 to Las Vegas in the Pacific Division Semi-Final.

History
The Fury entered the 2013–14 season as an expansion team in the Professional Arena Soccer League. They got off to a promising start with home wins over the Dallas Sidekicks and Sacramento Surge, but dropped six straight matches then struggled to find their way. With their only road win coming at fellow expansion team Bay Area Rosal, the Fury finished the season with a 5–11 record and missed the playoffs.

Off-field moves
The team established a non-profit organization named the Fury Foundation to promote healthy living to young people. Activities include school assemblies, soccer camps, and an educational program called "Health's A Kick".

In May 2014, the Professional Arena Soccer League added six teams from the failed third incarnation of the Major Indoor Soccer League and reorganized as the Major Arena Soccer League. With the league expansion and reorganization, the other Pacific teams for 2014–15 are California-based Sacramento Surge, San Diego Sockers, and Turlock Express plus the Las Vegas Legends and the expansion Seattle Impact. The Impact's assets were purchased mid-season and the team replaced on the schedule by the Tacoma Stars.

In September 2014, the Fury purchased the Tijuana-based Toros Mexico and designated the franchise as their official developmental team in the Premier Arena Soccer League. Former Toros Mexico owner Joe Pollard will serve as an assistant coach for the Fury as well as running the developmental team.

Schedule

Pre-season

Regular season

♠ Game played with multi-point scoring (most goals worth 2 points and select goals worth 3 points).
 Originally scheduled for February 15; rescheduled to avoid an arena conflict.

Post-season

Awards and honors
During the last regular season game, the Fury honored Tiguinho (#10) as the team's Offensive Player of the Year, Jose Rodriguez (#6) as Defensive Player of the Year, and Joey Pacheco (#3) as Iron Man of the Year.

Ontario midfielder Tiguinho Dias was selected for the 2014-15 MASL All-League Second Team. Ontario goalkeeper Alexis Apodaca earned honorable mention for the league's all-rookie team for 2014-15.

On March 13, the MASL announced the finalists for its major year-end awards. These nominees included Ontario general manager/coach Bernie Lilavois for Coach of the Year.

References

External links
Ontario Fury official website
Ontario Fury at The Press-Enterprise
Ontario Fury at Fontana Herald News

Ontario Fury
Ontario Fury
Ontario Fury 2014
Ontario Fury 2014